The 2019 Women's EuroHockey Championship was the 14th edition of the Women's EuroHockey Nations Championship, the biennial international women's field hockey championship of Europe organised by the European Hockey Federation.

It was held alongside the men's tournament from 17 to 25 August 2019 in Antwerp, Belgium. The tournament also served as a direct qualifier for the 2020 Tokyo olympics, with the winner qualifying.

The Netherlands won their tenth overall title after defeating Germany 2–0 in the final. Meanwhile, Spain conquered the bronze medal after a penalty-shootout win over England.

Qualified teams
The following teams, shown with pre-tournament world rankings, participated in the 2019 EuroHockey Championship.

Squads

Format
The eight teams were split into two groups of four teams. The top two teams advanced to the semifinals to determine the winner in a knockout system. The bottom two teams played in a new group with the teams they did not play against in the group stage. The last two teams were relegated to the EuroHockey Championship II.

Results
All times are local (UTC+2).

Preliminary round

Pool A

Pool B

Fifth to eighth place classification

Pool C
The points obtained in the preliminary round against the other team were taken over.

First to fourth place classification

Semi-finals

Third and fourth place

Final

Statistics

Final standings

Awards
The following awards were given at the conclusion of the tournament.

Goalscorers

See also
 2019 Men's EuroHockey Nations Championship
 2019 Women's EuroHockey Championship II
 2019 Women's EuroHockey Junior Championship

References

External links
Official website

 
Women's EuroHockey Nations Championship
EuroHockey Nations Championship
International women's field hockey competitions hosted by Belgium
EuroHockey Nations Championship
Field hockey at the Summer Olympics – Women's European qualification
Sports competitions in Antwerp
2010s in Antwerp
EuroHockey Nations Championship Women
Women 1